Laojiao may refer to:

 Re-education through labor
 Khufiyya or Old Teaching (老教)
 Luzhou Laojiao, a Chinese liquor